Stratford is a township municipality in Le Granit Regional County Municipality in the Estrie region in Quebec, Canada.  A township municipality is all or part of the territory of a township (townships were originally only a land surveying feature) set up as a municipality.

The first European settlers arrived in 1848. The town is named after Stratford-upon-Avon in England.

The town contains Lake Elgin and part of Lake Aylmer.

The population, almost entirely francophone, was 1,036 in the Canada 2021 Census.

Demographics 

Previous census data:
Population in 1991: 785
Population in 1996: 786 (+0.1% from 1991)
Population in 2001: 873

See also
Types of municipalities in Quebec

References

External links

Eastern Townships.org.
Google Maps.

Township municipalities in Quebec
Incorporated places in Estrie
Le Granit Regional County Municipality